Goodenia xanthotricha, commonly known as yellow-haired goodenia, is a species of flowering plant in the family Goodeniaceae and is endemic to a restricted area in the southwest of Western Australia. It is a herb-like shrub with sticky foliage, linear to lance-shaped leaves with the narrower end towards the base, racemes of blue flowers, and cylindrical to oval fruit.

Description

Taxonomy and naming
Goodenia xanthotricha was first formally described in 1854 by Willem Hendrik de Vriese in the journal Natuurkundige Verhandelingen van de Hollandsche Maatschappij der Wetenschappen te Haarlem. The specific epithet (xanthotricha) means "yellow hair".

Distribution and habitat
Yellow-haired goodenia grows on gravelly hills near Hill River in the Geraldton Sandplains and Swan Coastal Plain biogeographic regions of south-western Western Australia.

Conservation status
This goodenia is classified as "Priority Two" by the Western Australian Government Department of Parks and Wildlife, meaning that it is poorly known and from only one or a few locations.

References

xanthotricha
Endemic flora of Western Australia
Plants described in 1854
Taxa named by Willem Hendrik de Vriese